Prelude are an English-based vocal harmony group, who in their most famous line-up consisted of Brian Hume (vocals, guitar), his wife Irene Hume (vocals) and Ian Vardy (guitars, vocals). They formed in their native Gateshead in 1970, having initially released a single in 1967 as The Carnival.

Career
Prelude began to write their own material and built a following on the folk circuit and in 1973 they recorded their first album, How Long Is Forever?, on Dawn Records at Rockfield recording studios in Wales. From it came their best known recording, an a cappella version of the Neil Young song "After the Gold Rush", on Dawn. In the UK, it entered the Top 50 on 26 January 1974, had a nine-week stay, peaking at Number 21. In America, it entered the Billboard Hot 100 on 5 October 1974, and had a 13-week stay, peaking at No. 22.

Hume explained (in 1974) how the song came about:

The group subsequently toured the United States, but only scored one more hit "For a Dancer", which peaked at No.63. They then toured the UK, supporting Ralph McTell and Joan Armatrading. In 1981, they toured the UK with Don McLean. Also in 1974, they recorded backing vocals for the Ralph McTell's hit single, "Streets of London".

The group signed with EMI, and in 1980 scored their second UK hit with "Platinum Blonde". The group appeared on Top of the Pops to promote the single. The follow-up "Trick of the Light" failed to chart. Further success was achieved in 1982 when a re-recorded version of "After the Gold Rush" made the UK Top 30. The group released three further singles in the same year, namely, "Only The Lonely" (a cover of the Roy Orbison song), "City Tonight" and "Silent Night". An album, called simply Prelude, was also released at this time.

Vardy left the band in 1985. Irene and Brian Hume continued as a duo until 1987, when they were joined by Jim Hornsby (guitar, dobro and vocals), Tony Hornsby (bass and vocals) and Ian Tait (drums and percussion). By 1993, Hornsby had left and Prelude continued as a duo once more. They still wrote and performed on the circuit, along with Chris Ringer (bass/vocals). In 2008, they were rejoined by original member Ian Vardy, and performed as a four-piece. In 2010, Chris Ringer departed and Prelude were joined by Paul Hooper on drums and percussion, (who had recently left The Fortunes), and Steve Cunningham, ex Lindisfarne, on bass guitar. A CD was recorded with the new line-up entitled The Belle Vue Sessions, comprising mainly new Hume / Vardy compositions, was released in February 2011.

In 2012, Steve Cunningham was replaced by Keith Tulip on bass. The current line-up continues to tour.

Discography

Albums

Singles

References

External links
 Official website offline July 2018

Musical groups established in 1970
English folk musical groups
Dawn Records artists